Orange Park High School is a high school located in Orange Park, Florida. It is a part of the Clay County School District. The school opened as a junior-senior high school in Fall 1959, although it went only to 10th grade, so that the first graduating class was not until Spring 1962. The school celebrated its 50th anniversary in 2011, the 50th anniversary of the first 12th-grade class (1961-1962 school year).

The athletic teams are known as the Raiders. In the 2018–2019 school year the school had 1,623 students.

School Data 
The year of 2007-2008 had approximately 2,538 students and OPHS statistics indicated that 87% were college bound.
The school has 164 classrooms.
Most notable catchphrase- "Swords Up" (2017-N/A)
Matthew Boyack - Founder of 'Boyacklandia'
Lankford's stomping grounds

Athletic achievements

Football
The 1992 football team was undefeated in the regular season, were ranked #1 in the state for most of the season, and were ranked as high as No. 15 in the United States by USA Today.  The 1992 team were Florida Star Conference champs, District 1-5A champs, and went to the Region 1-5A finals (Final Four), where they lost to Bradenton Manatee.
The 2008 football team, the first led by Head Coach Danny Green, were Region 1-6A Division Champions and went to the 3rd round of the playoffs.
The 2009 football team were also Region 1-6A Division Champions, and went undefeated season the entire regular season.
The 2010 football team were Region 1-6A Division Champions, becoming the first team in Clay County history to win their district three consecutive years.

Boys basketball
The 1995 Boys Basketball Team was a Region 1-6A Finalist.
The 2007 Boys Basketball Team went (27-3) and were champions of District 1-6A in both the regular season and in the district tournament, champions of the St. Johns River Athletic Conference, and made it to the finals of Region 1-6A.

Boys soccer
The 2001 Boys Soccer Team won the state championship and was ranked #3 in the United States.

Non-athletic achievements
NJROTC
The NJROTC unit took 1st place at the Athletic, Academic & Drill National Championships for three consecutive years, 1991, 1992, and 1993. The 1994 unit came in 2nd place. The 1995 unit reclaimed the title again. Since then it has only managed a top ten finish once—a 6th-place finish in 2007, led by cadet commander Bill Owen.

Notable alumni 

Adrian White (1982) - American football defensive back and current assistant coach for the Buffalo Bills.
Brian Lee (1984) - Professional Wrestler (WWF, Smokey Mountain Wrestling, ECW, TNA, USWA)
 Todd Grisham - Current UFC analyst; Former ESPN anchor and commentator for World Wrestling Entertainment
Sid Roberson (1989) - former Major League Baseball pitcher with the Milwaukee Brewers.
Richard O. White, III, MD (1994) - Chair of Community Internal Medicine, Mayo Clinic - Jacksonville
 Greg Smith, a child prodigy who graduated from the school at only age 9. He later went on to Randolph–Macon College at only 10 years old. 
Sahel Kazemi (2004–2005) - Involved in the murder-suicide incident that took the life of NFL star quarterback Steve McNair of the Tennessee Titans.

References

External links 
 
 Orange Park High School Alumni
 School Profile

High schools in Clay County, Florida
Public high schools in Florida
Educational institutions established in 1961